Samabiyong Tea Garden (also spelt as Samabeyong) is a village in the Gorubathan CD block in the Kalimpong Sadar subdivision of the Kalimpong district  in the state of West Bengal, India.

Geography

Location

Samabeyong Tea Garden is 8 km from Lava.

Area overview
The map alongside shows the Kalimpong Sadar subdivision of Kalimpong district. This region is characterized by abruptly rising hills and numerous small streams. It is a predominantly rural area with 77.67% of the population living in rural areas and only 22.23% living in the urban areas. While Kalimpong is the only municipality, Dungra is the sole census town in the entire area. The economy is agro-based and there are 6 tea gardens in the Gorubathan CD block. In 2011, Kalimpong subdivision had a literacy rate of 81.85%, comparable with the highest levels of literacy in the districts of the state. While the first degree college in the subdivision was established at Kalimpong in 1962 the entire subdivision (and now the entire district), other than the head-quarters, had to wait till as late as 2015 (more than half a century) to have their first degree colleges at Pedong and Gorubathan.

Note: The map alongside presents some of the notable locations in the subdivision. All places marked in the map are linked in the larger full screen map.

Demographics
According to the 2011 Census of India, Samabiyong Tea Garden had a total population of 1,608 of which 824 (51%) were males and 784 (49%) were females. There were 156 persons in the age range of 0 to 6 years. The total number of literate people in Samabiyong Tea Garden was 1,216 (83.75% of the population over 6 years).

Economy
Samabeyong Tea Garden was established by the British Planters in 1887.

Tourism
"Samabeong is one of the most scenic places in the entire region." There is a hill-top lodge for tourists.

References

Cities and towns in Kalimpong district